Tetratheca remota is a species of plant in the quandong family that is endemic to Australia.

Description
The species grows as a small, slender shrub to 40 cm in height. The pink flowers appear in November.

Distribution and habitat
The range of the species lies in the Swan Coastal Plain and Geraldton Sandplains IBRA bioregions of south-west Western Australia. The plants grow on sandy gravel soils.

References

remota
Eudicots of Western Australia
Oxalidales of Australia
Taxa named by Joy Thompson
Plants described in 1976